Medeni Polyani is a village located in Sarnitsa Municipality, Southern Bulgaria.

Geography 
The village is located in a mountainous area, or rather in the Western Rhodopes. The elevation is about 1430 meters. It is near the permanently populated areas of Pobit Kamak and Sarnitsa.

History 
The old name of the village was Nova Mahala

Religion 
The population is predominately Muslim.

References 

Villages in Pazardzhik Province